"The Pez Dispenser" is the 31st episode of the sitcom Seinfeld. The episode was the fourteenth episode of the show's third season. It aired on January 15, 1992. The episode was written by Larry David and was directed by Tom Cherones.

Plot
At a piano recital given by George's girlfriend Noel, Jerry teases Elaine by balancing his Tweety Bird Pez dispenser upright on her leg, causing uncontrollable laughter from Elaine. Unnerved by the laughter, Noel makes an embarrassing flub, and afterwards tells George and his friends that the laughter has made her lose confidence in herself as a pianist. Elaine wants to apologize and explain, but George insists she remain silent for fear that Noel will break up with him if she learns Elaine was the one laughing.

Kramer creates a cologne that smells of the beach, but when he tries to sell the idea to Calvin Klein, the representative says that the beach is an offensive smell, pointing out that people shower after going to the beach to rid themselves of its odor. Jerry hosts an intervention for an old friend, Richie Appel. Richie developed a drug addiction because he believed himself to be the cause of Marty Benson's death from pneumonia after Kramer told him to pour Gatorade on his head after winning a softball game.

George is frustrated that he does not have any leverage in his relationship with Noel, stating that "I need hand. I have no hand," and fears Noel will break up with him. Acting on advice from Kramer, George preemptively breaks up with her, but she gives into his demands to persuade him to stay thereby giving him "hand". Later, at the intervention, Noel hears Elaine laughing, realizes George lied, and she breaks up with him. Richie agrees to enter rehab after seeing the Pez dispenser, which brings up a childhood memory and causes him to admit his drug problem. Richie does well in rehab, but is now addicted to Pez.

Cultural references

George raves about Noel playing the Waldstein. Ludwig van Beethoven composed his "Waldstein Sonata" in 1803 and dedicated it to Count Ferdinand Ernst Gabriel von Waldstein.

Noel plays Beethoven's Piano Sonata No. 8 at the concert when Elaine leaves laughing. The same piece is played in a very similar scene in George Cukor's Gaslight.

Marty Benson's death from pneumonia after having a bucket of Gatorade dumped on him is a reference to the death of Hall of Fame football coach George Allen in 1990, 44 days after being doused by a celebratory Gatorade shower.

References

External links 
 

Seinfeld (season 3) episodes
1992 American television episodes
Television episodes written by Larry David
Pez